Mikhail Vasilyevich Ignatyev (Mihal Vaślin yvӑl Jӑkӑnatjev; ; 8 January 1962 – 18 June 2020) was a Russian politician who served as the Head of the Chuvashia from 2010 to 2020.

Early life
Mikhail Vasilyevich Ignatyev was born on 8 January 1962, and graduated from Chuvash State University and Volga-Vyatka Academy of Public Administration.

Career

Politics
From 1996 to 1999, Ignatyev served as the Deputy Minister of Agriculture and Food of Chuvashia. On 14 January 2002, he was appointed to replace Petr Ivantaev as First Deputy Chairman of the Cabinet of Ministers by President of Chuvashia Nikolay Fyodorov. On 6 May 2004, he became the Deputy Chairman of the Cabinet of Minister.

Head of Chuvash Republic

On 28 July 2010, Ignatyev was appointed by the State Council of the Chuvash Republic as President of the Chuvash Republic after being proposed by President Dmitry Medvedev. In the state council 37 deputies voted in favor, five against, and one abstained. He took office on 29 August.

On 1 January 2012, the title of the office was changed to Head of Chuvashia. On 9 June 2015, he was appointed acting head of the republic by President Vladimir Putin and was later elected to a second term with 65.54% of the popular vote on 13 September.

Dismissal
On 18 January 2020, Ignatyev called for the "wiping out" of journalists who criticize the government during a National Press Day speech.

On 23 January, Ignatyev participated in a review of the Cheboksary rescue equipment with Cheboksary's Emergency Response Department head and Chuvashia's civil defense minister. At a ceremony where the keys to multiple fire engines were presented Ignatyev forced a shorter emergency worker to jump multiple times for the keys.

On 28 January, Ignatyev was expelled from United Russia, and on 29 January, President Putin dismissed Ignatyev as Head of the Chuvash Republic and replaced him with Oleg Nikolayev as acting head.

Later life
On 20 May 2020, Ignatyev filed a lawsuit against Putin with the Supreme Court of Russia for wrongful dismissal and his lawsuit was accepted on 21 May. The set hearings for the lawsuit were supposed to start on 30 June.

On 27 May, he was hospitalized due to bilateral pneumonia with a large amount of his lungs damaged. On 18 June, Ignatyev died in a Saint Petersburg hospital from heart failure after contracting COVID-19 during the COVID-19 pandemic in Russia.

References

External links

 Биография на официальном портале Чувашии
 Биография на сайте ГУ МЧС России по Чувашской Республике

1962 births
2020 deaths
21st-century Russian politicians
Chuvash people
People from Chuvashia
Heads of the Chuvash Republic
United Russia politicians
Deaths from the COVID-19 pandemic in Russia